The Cuddeback Union School District (also, Cuddeback Elementary School District), headquartered in Carlotta, California, oversees public education, through grade 8, in a portion of central Humboldt County, California.  The school it operates is the Cuddeback School in Carlotta.

As of 2022, the school board consisted of five members:
Todd Calvo
Harry Dibble
Jacob Morss
Leonard Ward
Erik Bess

In 2022, the superintendent was Blaine Sigler.

References

External links
 

School districts in Humboldt County, California